The Mark is the 17th tallest building in San Diego, California and is a prominent fixture in San Diego's skyline. It has a height of 381 ft (116 m) and 259 units. Located in the East Village district of Downtown San Diego, The Mark is a 33-story building that utilizes the postmodern architectural style and was designed by the architect firms Martinez & Cutri Corp. and Shears Adkins Architects, LLC.

See also
List of tallest buildings in San Diego

External links 

The Mark at Isellthecity.com

Buildings and structures completed in 2007
Residential skyscrapers in San Diego